Frank Brennan (15 December 1947 – 1 September 2015) was an Irish tax inspector and an author on tax-related subjects.

Accomplishments
Throughout his lifetime, Brennan earned himself a reputation as being "the widely respected economist and tax consultant who designed the blueprint for tackling Ireland's black economy in the early 1990s." He did this through his well-researched paper that explained how to harness black money "to kick-start an otherwise stagnant economy."

Publications
 A Company Purchasing its own Shares, 1991
 Brennan & Howley tax acts commentary : 2000–2001
 Brennan & Howley tax acts commentary : 2001–2002
He also coauthored the Tax Commentary for many years.

References

1947 births
2015 deaths
20th-century Irish economists
21st-century Irish economists